According to Political Party Act (2005), a political party is considered as a union of Mongolian citizens who have consolidated voluntarily with the purpose of organising social, personal and political activities as stated in the Constitution of Mongolia. Political parties must be registered by the Supreme Court of Mongolia.

Current parties

Currently there are 36 political parties officially registered by the Supreme Court.

Parties with MPs in the State Great Khural

Other parties
Mongolian Green Party (Mongolyn Nogoon Nam)
Civil Will–Green Party (Irgenii Zorig Nogoon Nam)
Mongolian Traditional United Party (Mongolyn Ulamjlalyn Negdsen Nam)
Mongolian Social Democratic Party (Mongolyn Sotsial Demokrat Nam)
Mongol Liberal Democratic Party (Mongol Liberal Ardchilsan Nam)
Motherland Party (Ekh Oron Nam)
Mongolian Liberal Party (Mongolyn Liberal Nam)
Republican Party (Bügd Nairamdakh Nam)
Mongolian National Women's Party (Mongolyn Emegteichüüdiin Ündesnii Nam) 
People's Party (Ard Tümnii Nam)
Mongolian National Democratic Party (Mongolyn Ündesnii Ardchilsan Nam)
Freedom for People Party (Erkh Chölöög Kheregjüülegch Nam)
Civil Movement Party (Irgenii Khödölgöönii Nam)
Development Program Party (Khögjliin Khötölböriin Nam)
Mongolian Democratic Movement Party (Mongolyn Ardchilsan Khödölgöönii Nam)
All Mongolian Labor Party (Khamug Mongolyn Khödölmöriin Nam)
United Patriots Party (Ekh Oronchdyn Negdsen Nam)
Mongol Conservative Party (Mongol Konservativ Nam)
Independence and Unity Party (Tusgaar Togtnol, Ev Negdliin Nam)
Love the People Party (Ard Tümnee Khairlaya Nam)
For the Mongolian People Party (Mongolyn Khünii Tölöö Nam)
Truth and Right Party  (Ünen ba Zöv Nam)
Demos Party (Zon Olny Nam)
World Mongols Party (Delkhiin Mongolchuud Nam)
People's Majority Governance Party (Ard Tümnii Olonkhiin Zasaglal Nam)
Great Harmony Party (Ikh Ev Nam)
Ger Area Development Party (Ger Khoroolol Khögjliin nam)
My Mongolia Party (Minii Mongol Nam)
Mongolian Reform Party (Mongol Shinechlelt Nam)
Citizen’s Coalition for Justice Party (Shudarga Irgediin Negdsen Evsel Nam)
Democracy and Reforms Party (Ardchilal Shinechleliin Nam)

Defunct parties
 Mongolian Democratic Party (1990) (MDP) - merged into Mongolian National Democratic Party
 Mongolian National Progress Party (MNPP) - merged into Mongolian National Democratic Party
Mongolian People's Revolutionary Party (MPRP)- merged into Mongolian People's Party

Notes

See also
 Politics of Mongolia
 List of political parties by country
 Elections in Mongolia

Mongolia
 
Political parties
Political parties
Mongolia